Topalian (Western Armenian Թօփալեան) is an Armenian surname. It may refer to:

Leon Topalian, American businessman, CEO of Nucor since January 2020
Mourad Topalian (born 1943), prominent Armenian-American political activist, former chairman of the Armenian National Committee of America (ANCA)
Stephanie Topalian or just Stephanie (born 1987), Japanese American singer, songwriter and actress of mixed Japanese and Armenian descent. Also part of Genealogy, Armenian entry to Eurovision Song Contest 2015